In The Air is the fifth album released by American band The Handsome Family. It was released in 2000 by Carrot Top Records (North America) / Loose Music (Europe) and comes as an enhanced audio CD with an additional video for the song "Amelia Earhart vs. The Dancing Bear," from Milk and Scissors (directed by Bill Ward).

Track listing
All music by Brett Sparks, all lyrics by Rennie Sparks.
 "Don't Be Scared" – 2:39
 "The Sad Milkman" – 3:40
 "In The Air" – 3:30
 "A Beautiful Thing" – 3:39
 "So Much Wine" – 3:48
 "Up Falling Rock Hill" – 2:57
 "Poor, Poor Lenore" – 3:41
 "When That Helicopter Comes" – 2:32
 "Grandmother Waits For You" (inspired by "Where We'll Never Grow Old" as performed by The Smith Sacred Singers) – 3:50
 "Lie Down" - 3:30
 "My Beautiful Bride" - 3:17

Additional Personnel
 Brad Miller - Band photo
 Andrew Bird - violin on "Poor, Poor Lenore", "Up Falling Rock Hill" and "When That Helicopter..."
 Darrel Sparks - back-up caterwaul on "When That Helicopter..."; guitar on "The Sad Milkman"

References

External links
The Handsome Family official website

2000 albums
The Handsome Family albums
Carrot Top Records albums
Loose Music albums